Mount Anne is a mountain of 3,870 meters in height, standing 6 nautical miles (11 km) north of Mount Elizabeth, in Queen Alexandra Range. It was discovered by the Nimrod Expedition (1907–09) and named for Anne Dawson-Lambton, a supporter of the expedition.

References

Mountains of the Ross Dependency